Alpigenobombus is a subgenus of the genus Bombus.

Species:
Bombus angustus
Bombus breviceps
Bombus genalis
Bombus grahami
Bombus kashmirensis
Bombus nobilis
Bombus validus
Bombus wurflenii

Bumblebees
Insect subgenera